Danila Vitalevich Klimovich (born 9 January 2003) is a Belarusian ice hockey centre assigned to the Abbotsford Canucks of the American Hockey League, while under contract to the Vancouver Canucks of the National Hockey League (NHL). He previously played for Dinamo Molodechno in the Belarusian Extraleague. He was selected 41st overall by the Canucks in the 2021 NHL Entry Draft. Internationally he has played for the Belarusian national team at the 2021 World Championships.

Playing career
Klimovich began his career in his native Belarus. In 2020 he was selected by the Rouyn-Noranda Huskies of the Quebec Major Junior Hockey League at the CHL Import Draft. While he planned to move to North America for the 2020–21, the COVID-19 pandemic kept him from doing so. Instead he spent most of the 2020–21 season playing for Minskie Zubry of the Vysshaya Liga, the second-tier league in Belarus, where he had 52 points in 37 games. He also played six games in the Belarusian Extraleague with Dinamo Molodechno, and scored one goal.

Going into the 2021 NHL Entry Draft Klimovich was rated by the NHL's Central Scouting Bureau as the 19th best European-based skater. He was selected 41st overall by the Vancouver Canucks. He signed with the Canucks on 28 July 2021.

Klimovich moved to North America after the draft and was assigned to the Canucks' American Hockey League (AHL) affiliate, the Abbotsford Canucks. The youngest player in the AHL during the 2021–22 season, Klimovich recorded 8 goals and 18 assists in 63 games, though did not play in any of the team's playoff games.

International play
Klimovich played for the Belarusian under-18 national team at the 2021 World U18 Championships, where he had 6 goals in 5 games, including a hat-trick against Switzerland. He made his debut with the Belarus senior team at the 2021 World Championships, appearing in three games.

Personal life
A native of Belarus, Klimovich moved to North America in 2021 after being drafted by the Canucks. He married Nastassia Bartsevich on 10 April 2022 in Cultus Lake, British Columbia.

Career statistics

Regular season and playoffs

International

References

External links
 

2003 births
Living people
Abbotsford Canucks players
Belarusian ice hockey centres
Dinamo Molodechno players
Sportspeople from Pinsk
Vancouver Canucks draft picks